Niphoparmena elgonensis is a species of beetle in the family Cerambycidae. It was described by Stephan von Breuning in 1939.

It's 12 mm long and 3 mm wide, and its type locality is Mount Elgon, Kenya.

References

elgonensis
Beetles described in 1939
Taxa named by Stephan von Breuning (entomologist)